Daphne Fowler (née Bradshaw, previously Hudson; born 5 January 1939) is a British game show champion who has taken part in many televised game shows. She has won many titles, including winning Fifteen to One (twice), Going for Gold and Brain of Britain.

Fowler took part in the gameshow Eggheads, where she was one of the team of seven gameshow champions challenged daily by a new quiz team. Fowler has been described as "Britain's best-known female quiz contestant".

Early life and career
Fowler was born in Warwick, Warwickshire, but moved to Cheriton, Kent aged 6 where she attended Harcourt County Primary School. She then attended Folkestone Girls Grammar School and the University of Exeter where she took a Degree in Theology. She later worked for the National Westminster Bank as a secretary until she took early retirement, having begun to appear as a contestant on game shows.

Eggheads

Fowler appeared on the British quiz show Eggheads from 2003, a quiz team described on the show as "arguably the most formidable quiz team in the country", and was the oldest member of the team. As of 27 May 2014, Fowler retired from Eggheads, being replaced by the returning CJ de Mooi.

Quiz game show record

References

External links
Eggheads - 12yard Productions
Daphne Fowler - quizplayers.com
UK Gameshows Page: Daphne Fowler

1939 births
Living people
Contestants on British game shows
People from Warwick
People from Weston-super-Mare
People educated at Folkestone School for Girls
Alumni of the University of Exeter